Ronald James Phoenix (30 June 1929 – March 2021) was an English footballer who played as a wing half in the Football League for Manchester City and Rochdale.

In May 2019, Phoenix resided in a care home in Trafford, Greater Manchester. 

His death was announced on 10 March 2021. He was 91.

References

1929 births
2021 deaths
English footballers
People from Stretford
Association football wing halves
Manchester City F.C. players
Rochdale A.F.C. players
Altrincham F.C. players
English Football League players
Footballers from Greater Manchester